Celaque Airport  is an airport serving the town of Gracias in Lempira Department, Honduras. The airport was inaugurated in 2013.

There is high terrain southwest of the airport.

See also

 Transport in Honduras
 List of airports in Honduras

References

External links
OpenStreetMap - Celaque Airport
 FallingRain - Celaque Airport
 OurAirports - Celaque Airport

 Roatan-Gracias-Copán Air Triangle for Cruise Tourists - Central America Data
 Airports will draw cruise passengers - Honduras Weekly

Airports in Honduras
Airports established in 2013
2013 establishments in Honduras
Lempira Department